The (Lunar) Eclipse is a 1992 film by the Iranian director Rasool Mollagholipoor. Mollagholipoor also scripted the film which starred Hamid Abdolmaleki, Fariborz Arabnia and Mahmoud Basiri.

References

Iranian drama films
1992 films
1990s Persian-language films